The 1980 Chatham Cup was the 53rd annual nationwide knockout football competition in New Zealand.

Early stages of the competition were run in three regions (northern, central, and southern), with the National League teams receiving a bye until the Fourth Round of the competition. In all, 93 teams took part in the competition. Note: Different sources give different numberings for the rounds of the competition: some start round one with the beginning of the regional qualifications; others start numbering from the first national knock-out stage. The former numbering scheme is used in this article.

The 1980 final
The match returned to its former regular home, the Basin Reserve, for the first time since 1972. Mount Wellington won the competition, becoming the third team to win the league/cup double. Dunedin City became the first side from that southern city to reach the final since Saint Kilda in 1965.

Te match was a dour affair, with the Mount scoring both of the goals. The first was scored after eleven minutes when a Clive Campbell corner was headed into the Dunedin goal by Stewart Carruthers — a welcome change from his sending off in the previous year's final. The second goal, from Billy McClure, was the highlight of the match.

Results

Third Round

* Won on penalties by Ngaruawahia (4-2) and Wanganui (7-5)

Fourth Round

Fifth Round

Quarter-finals

Semi-finals

Final

References

Rec.Sport.Soccer Statistics Foundation New Zealand 1980 page
UltimateNZSoccer website 1980 Chatham Cup page

Chatham Cup
Chatham Cup
Chatham Cup
Chat